Liboyer folksblat ('Liepāja People's Paper') was a weekly newspaper published from Liepāja, Latvia 1931–1934. The first issue was published on September 8, 1931.

References

Publications established in 1931
Publications disestablished in 1934
Defunct newspapers published in Latvia
Yiddish newspapers
Yiddish culture in Latvia
1931 establishments in Latvia